Kano Road Traffic Agency is a Kano State government agency which was established to transform the state's transportation system and ensure free traffic in Kano as well as reduce road accidents.

History 
The Kano Road Traffic Agency (KAROTA)or (AR5) is a traffic management agency which was established by former Governor of Kano State, Rabiu Kwankwaso in 2012 in order to sanitize the roads by ensuring road users in Kano state upheld the law.

References

Government agencies established in 2012
State agencies and parastatals of Nigeria
Transport authorities in Nigeria
2012 establishments in Nigeria
Organizations based in Kano
Government of Kano State
Transport in Kano
Road authorities